The 1900 Atlantic hurricane season featured the Galveston hurricane, the deadliest natural disaster in the history of the United States. A total of 10 tropical cyclones formed, seven of which intensified into a tropical storm. Three of those made landfall in the United States. The first system was initially observed over the central Atlantic Ocean on January 17, while the final storm transitioned into an extratropical cyclone on October 28. These dates fall within the period with the most tropical cyclone activity in the Atlantic. Every storm of the season except the seventh system existed simultaneously with another tropical cyclone.

Of the season's seven tropical storms, three reached hurricane status. Furthermore, two of those three strengthened into major hurricanes, which are Category 3 or higher on the modern-day Saffir–Simpson hurricane wind scale. The strongest cyclone of the season, the first hurricane, peaked at Category 4 strength with maximum sustained winds of 145 mph (230 km/h). Upon striking Texas shortly after peak intensity, it produced a devastating storm surge in the Galveston area, with devastated city and caused at least 8,000 fatalities. Nicknamed the "1900 Galveston hurricane", it remains the deadliest natural disaster in the history of the United States. The hurricane also caused about $35.5 million (1900 USD) in damage. Impact from other tropical cyclones was generally minor, though the remnants of Tropical Storm Five resulted in one death and at least $100,000 in damage in Atlantic Canada.


Season summary 

Tropical cyclogenesis began with the development of a tropical depression over the central Atlantic on January 17. After the depression transitioned into an extratropical cyclone on the following day, the next system did not develop until June 9, while just north of the Lesser Antilles. This coincided with the formation of a third tropical depression over the northeastern Gulf of Mexico on the same day. The former moved generally north-northwestward for several days until becoming extratropical northeast of the Bahamas on June 17, while the latter made landfall in southeastern Louisiana on June 12, two days before dissipating over Mississippi. However, the season's first such of at least tropical storm intensity did not develop until August 27 while well west of Cape Verde. This was abnormally late, as the average date of development of the first tropical storm between 1944 and 1996 was July 11. In comparison, the latest date of the first tropical storm during the satellite era was Hurricane Anita on August 29, 1977. During the month of September, which is the climatological peak of hurricane season, three additional tropical cyclones formed, two of which were hurricanes. After the third hurricane dissipated on September 23, activity went dormant for nearly two weeks, until the fifth tropical storm formed near the Lesser Antilles on October 4. As it was becoming extratropical, a sixth tropical cyclone developed in the Bay of Campeche on October 10. The final system formed in the eastern Caribbean Sea, crossed Hispaniola, and transitioned into an extratropical cyclone between Bermuda and the East Coast of the United States on October 28.

By far, the storm that caused the most devastation was Hurricane One, nicknamed the "Galveston hurricane". Its storm surge submerged much of Galveston Island in Texas, killing between 6,000 and 12,000 people. Official estimates put the death toll at approximately 8,000. As a result, it is currently the deadliest natural disaster in the history of the United States. At the time, it was also the second deadliest tropical cyclone in the Atlantic basin, behind only the Great Hurricane of 1780, which killed at least 22,000 people in the Lesser Antilles. However, the Galveston hurricane was surpassed in 1998 by Hurricane Mitch, which caused more than 11,000 fatalities in Central America. The storm was also among the deadliest in Canada, where at least 102 people were killed. Few other tropical cyclones during the 1900 Atlantic hurricane season caused any damage or fatalities. However, the extratropical remnants of Tropical Storm Five brought moderate damage to Canada. The storm caused 1 fatality and about $100,000 in losses, mainly to railroads.

The season's activity was reflected with an accumulated cyclone energy (ACE) rating of 81. ACE is a metric used to express the energy used by a tropical cyclone during its lifetime. Therefore, a storm with a longer duration will have high values of ACE. Thus, tropical depressions are not included here.

Systems

Hurricane One 

The Great Galveston Hurricane of 1900

It slowly strengthened while moving steadily west-northwestward and entered the northeastern Caribbean on August 30. The storm moved south of Puerto Rico and made landfall in Dominican Republic as a weak tropical storm on September 2. It weakened slightly while crossing Hispaniola, before re-emerging into the Caribbean Sea later that day. On September 3, the cyclone struck modern day Santiago de Cuba Province and then slowly drifted along the southern coast of Cuba. Upon reaching the Gulf of Mexico on September 6, the storm strengthened into a hurricane, while situated near Dry Tortugas.

It weakened quickly after moving inland and fell to tropical storm intensity late on September 9. The storm turned east-northeastward and became extratropical over Iowa on September 11. The extratropical system strengthened while accelerating across the Midwestern United States, Ontario, Quebec, northern New England, and then New Brunswick before reaching the Gulf of Saint Lawrence on September 13. Later that day, the extratropical remnants struck Newfoundland. It then reached the far North Atlantic Ocean and began to weaken, finally dissipating near Iceland on September 15.

Much of Florida experienced tropical storm force winds, though no damage occurred. Hurricane-force winds and storm surge inundated portions of southern Louisiana, though no significant damage or fatalities were reported. In Texas, strong winds were reported in the Galveston area, reaching . Storm surge cresting between  inundated the entirety of Galveston Island. Every house sustained damage, with at least 3,636 destroyed. In Galveston alone, approximately 10,000 were left homeless, out of a total population of 37,000. The actual death toll is unknown, though it is thought to be at least 8,000. Thus, the 1900 Galveston hurricane was the deadliest natural disaster in the history of the United States. Property damage from the storm in Galveston alone was estimated at $30 million. Farther north, the storm and its remnants continued to produce heavy rains and gusty winds across the Midwestern United States, Mid-Atlantic, and New England. The storm downed telegraph wires, signs, and trees in several states and caused 15 deaths in Ohio; 6 in Wisconsin; 2 each in Illinois and New York; and 1 each in Massachusetts and Missouri. The remnants brought severe impact to Canada. In the province of Ontario, damage reached about $1.35 million, with about $1 million incurred to crops. There were at least 107 deaths in Canada, mostly due to sunken vessels near Newfoundland and the French territory of Saint Pierre and Miquelon.

Hurricane Two 

A ship reported strong gales in the vicinity of Cape Verde on September 7. It quickly strengthened to a strong tropical storm on September 8, but then maintained that intensity for nearly five days. The system was not tracked until being encountered by the steamship Hungaria on September 13, at which time it was already a hurricane. Originally, the system was listed as Hurricane Four, it was operationally believed to have developed after the next two tropical cyclones. Later on September 14, it strengthened further into a Category 2 hurricane while moving northwestward.

Re-curving northward, the system intensified into a Category 3 hurricane on September 16. However, it weakened to a Category 2 hurricane later on September 17. Shortly thereafter, the storm bypassed southeast of Bermuda, bring gusty winds but little impact. It then re-curved northeastward. The system weakened back to a Category 1 hurricane on September 18. Later that day, it weakened to a tropical storm and then to a tropical depression early on September 19.

Hurricane Three 

The storm gradually strengthened as it was heading west-northward. By late on September 9, the system strengthened into a hurricane. It passed southwest of Cape Verde on the following day. The storm then intensified slowly, becoming a Category 2 hurricane early on September 12. Later on September 12, it re-curved north-northwestward. After turning north-northeast, the storm began executing a small cyclonic loop on September 14.

A weakening trend soon occurred, with it weakening to a Category 1 hurricane early on September 15. About four days later, the hurricane completed its cyclonic loop and then headed west-northwestward. The system weakened to a tropical storm early on September 20. During the next few days, the storm decelerated and turned westward. Late on September 22, it weakened to a tropical depression.

Tropical Storm Four 

Weather maps first indicated a tropical storm over the northwestern Caribbean Sea on September 11. Heading northwestward, the system brushed the Yucatán Peninsula as weak tropical storm. Early on September 13, the storm re-curved northeastward and began weakening. At 0600 UTC on September 13, it made landfall near Venice, Louisiana, at the same intensity.

Early on September 14, the storm weakened to a tropical depression. It weakened slowly while moving northeastward across the Deep South, before dissipating near Athens, Georgia, on September 15. Operationally, it was considered the third tropical cyclone of the season. A telegraph from the Weather Bureau headquarters in Washington, D.C. warned vessels to remain in port for portions of the Gulf Coast of the United States. Strong gales were experienced along the coast from eastern Louisiana to western Florida and severely disrupted telegraph services in the region. The winds and tidal inundation exacerbated crop damage caused by an earlier storm along the Mississippi River in southeastern Louisiana. Growing rice was damaged in Cameron Parish but left unaffected in other parts of the state. The remnants brought heavy rains from Virginia to New England. Rough seas along the coast of New Jersey washed the schooner Willie ashore.

Tropical Storm Five 

Initially, the system remained weak and failed to strengthen into a tropical storm until October 7. It began to execute a cyclonic loop by early on the following day. Further intensification occurred and the storm peaked with winds of  early on October 9. Eventually, it accelerated north-northeastward and became extratropical early on October 10. The remnants moved northward and eventually curved northeastward. Late on October 11, the extratropical remnants struck Nova Scotia. It continued rapidly across Atlantic Canada and re-emerged into the Atlantic. By October 14, the remnants dissipated near the southern tip of Greenland.

The remnants of Tropical Storm Five brought severe impact to Canada. In Nova Scotia, 13 schooners were grounded, while 2 were destroyed. Strong winds downed telegraph wires in the eastern end of the province, while barns were de-roofed and trees were felled in Bayfield. Other low-lying areas were flooded. Washouts disrupted the Canadian Pacific Railway service and swept away portions of the tracks. The cost to repairs the tracks was estimated at $100,000. There was also damage to highways and bridges. A child drowned after attempting to cross a swollen creek. On Prince Edward Island, winds damaged small buildings and knocked chimneys of some houses. Electrical wires were reported down in Charlottetown.

Tropical Storm Six 

The sixth tropical storm of the season developed in the Bay of Campeche on October 10. Operationally, it was believed that the storm originated over eastern Cuba. The storm re-curved east-northeastward and made landfall near modern-day Horseshoe Beach, Florida, at the same intensity early the next day.

The remnants moved along the East Coast of the United States, striking the Outer Banks of North Carolina, Long Island in New York, and New England. It continued inland over Canada, until dissipating over Labrador on October 15. Impact from the storm was generally minor. Rainfall and gusty winds were reported between Florida and the Carolinas. Further north, it brought brisk to strong winds to New Jersey and southern New England.

Tropical Storm Seven 

Telegraph reports indicate that a tropical depression developed in the eastern Caribbean Sea on October 24. It did not weaken while crossing Hispaniola and instead strengthened into a tropical storm shortly after emerging into the Atlantic Ocean near the northwestern tip of Haiti. Late on October 27, the storm re-curved north-northeastward and pass through the eastern Bahamas.

Early on October 28, the storm accelerated and re-curved slightly to the northeast. The extratropical remnants persisted until dissipating later on October 29. No impact was reported in either Dominican Republic or Haiti. Much of eastern Cuba reported light rains, particularly in the provinces of Camagüey and Santiago de Cuba. Strong winds were reported throughout the Bahamas, though no damage occurred. As far west as Jupiter, Florida, wind gusts reached .

Other systems
A trough over the central Atlantic developed into a tropical depression on January 17. The depression moved northeastward and transitioned into an extratropical cyclone on January 19 while being absorbed by a frontal system. Historical weather maps indicate that the next tropical depression formed over the Atlantic just north of the Lesser Antilles on June 9. The depression may have intensified into a tropical storm on the following day, based on observations from a nearby ship. Continuing generally north-northwestward, the depression became extratropical after June 17. A third tropical depression also formed on June 9 over the northeastern Gulf of Mexico. The depression initially drifted northeastward and then doubled-back to the southwest. On June 11, the system turned northwestward and made landfall near Grand Isle, Louisiana, early the next day. The depression dissipated over Mississippi by June 14.

Season effects

This is a table of all of the storms that have formed in the 1900 Atlantic hurricane season. It includes their duration, names, landfall(s)–denoted by bold location names – damages, and death totals. Deaths in parentheses are additional and indirect (an example of an indirect death would be a traffic accident), but were still related to that storm. Damage and deaths include totals while the storm was extratropical, a wave, or a low, and all of the damage figures are in 1900 USD.

See also 

 List of tropical cyclones
 Atlantic hurricane season
 1900–1940 South Pacific cyclone seasons
 1900–1950 South-West Indian Ocean cyclone seasons
 1900s Australian region cyclone seasons

Notes

References

External links 

 Monthly Weather Review

 
Articles which contain graphical timelines
1900 meteorology
1900 natural disasters